Guangfu may refer to:

 Guangzhou or Guangfu, the capital of Guangdong, China
 Guangfu Ancient City, a village in Handan, Hebei, China
 Guangfu, Hualien, a township in eastern Taiwan
 Guangfu Road in Taipei, Taiwan
 Guangfu dialect, a family of Cantonese dialects
 Guangfuhui or Guangfu Society, a 20th-century anti-Qing secret society

See also
 Suzhou Guangfu Airport, a military airport in Suzhou, Jiangsu, China
 Xiluo Guangfu Temple in Yunlin County, Taiwan